Magdalena Breguła (17 May 1921 – 4 June 1957) was a Polish athlete. She competed in the women's shot put at the 1952 Summer Olympics.

References

1921 births
1957 deaths
Athletes (track and field) at the 1952 Summer Olympics
Polish female shot putters
Olympic athletes of Poland
Place of birth missing